Bob Cowell may refer to:

 Bobby Cowell (1922–1996), English footballer
 Bob Cowell (swimmer) (1924–1960), American swimmer

See also
 Robert Cowell (born 1968), English racehorse trainer